Friedhelm Loh Group is a German manufacturing and services group headed by Friedhelm Loh. It is headquartered in Haiger, Germany and has offices and production centres worldwide.  

Friedhelm Loh Group grew out of a business founded in 1961 by Friedhelm's father Rudolf Loh that manufactured and sold the "first mass-produced enclosures for electrical control systems".

The group employs more than 11,600 people (2021) and generates revenues of € 2.5 billion (2021). The major companies in the Group's portfolio are Rittal, EPLAN, Cideon, LKH, Stahlo, and German Edge Cloud.

Companies within the Group
Companies in the group and their products include:
 Rittal: enclosures, power distribution systems, IT infrastructure, software and services
 Stahlo: steel service centres
 EPLAN: Computer Aided Engineering (CAE) software
 LKH: plastic products in the electrical goods, automotive, manufacturing and construction sectors
 Cideon: engineering process services
 German Edge Cloud: cloud computing
 Digital Technology Poland: software and hardware Research & Development 
 Loh Services: services for other companies within the group, such as IT and HR

References

Companies based in Hesse